Hugo Wilhelm Ludwig Kaun (21 March 1863 – 2 April 1932) was a German composer, conductor, and music teacher.

Biography
Kaun was born in Berlin, Germany and completed his musical training in his native city. In 1886 (or 1887), he left Germany for the United States and settled in Milwaukee, Wisconsin, which was home to a well-established German immigrant community. As the conductor of local choral societies, such as the Milwaukee Liederkranz and the Milwaukee Men's Choir, Kaun quickly acquired an important influence in the city's musical life. He also taught at the conservatory, where his colleagues included Wilhelm Middelschulte. Kaun's eldest son, Bernhard Kaun, later became a composer of film scores in Hollywood.

At the turn of the century, Kaun returned to Germany and continued his teaching in Berlin. Although he received numerous lucrative offers of employment from abroad, these inducements could not persuade him to leave Berlin a second time. In 1912, he was appointed to the Prussian Academy of Arts. He chronicled his eventful life in his autobiography Aus meinem Leben (From My Life). He died in Berlin.

Music
Kaun composed in a Romantic style for a wide range of genres, including operas, symphonies, tone poems, pieces for solo organ and piano, as well as works for other combinations of instruments. His opera Der Fremde was first performed at the Dresden Hofoper (now the Semperoper) on 23 February 1920, with a cast including Richard Tauber, Elisabeth Rethberg and Friedrich Plaschke, conducted by Fritz Reiner.

Notable students include composer Fannie Charles Dillon and pianist Myrtle Elvyn.

Notable works

Operas
 Der Pietist ("The Pietist", or "Oliver Brown") (1885)
 Sappho, musical drama (1917)
 Der Fremde (The Stranger, 1920)
 Menandra (1927)

Orchestral
 Symphonies:
 Symphony No. 1 in D minor, "To My Fatherland", Op. 22 (1898)
 Symphony No. 2 in C minor, Op. 85 (1908)
 Symphony No. 3 in E minor, Op. 96 (1913)
 Vineta, symphonic poem, Op. 16 (1886)
 The Painter of Antwerp, Overture (1899)
 Sir John Falstaff, symphonic poem, Op. 60 (1904)
 Märkische Suite for orchestra, Op. 92 (1914)
 Hanne Nüte, Ouvertüre, Op. 107 (1918)
 Juventuti et Patriae, academic overture, Op. 126 (1930)

Concertos
 Piano Concerto in B minor, WoO, withdrawn (1898)
 Piano Concerto No. 1 in E flat minor, Op. 50 (1901)
 Piano concerto No. 2 in C minor, Op. 115 (1921)
 Fantasiestück for violin and orchestra, op. 66. (1905)

Chamber music
 Octet, Op. 34
 Piano Trio No. 2, Op. 58
 Humoresques for piano, Op. 79
 Choralvorspiele for organ, Op. 89

References

External links
Hugo Kaun papers in the Music Division of The New York Public Library for the Performing Arts.
Brief profile in German
Brief profile in English, with CDs, examples, video clip
free sheet music by Hugo Kaun (2 Piano-Pieces)
 

1863 births
1932 deaths
19th-century German male musicians
20th-century German conductors (music)
20th-century German male musicians
German male classical composers
German male conductors (music)
German Romantic composers
Pupils of Bernhard Ziehn